Coleraine railway station serves the town of Coleraine in County Londonderry, Northern Ireland. It shares facilities with the town's Ulsterbus bus depot.

History

The station was opened by the Ballymena, Ballymoney, Coleraine and Portrush Junction Railway on 4 December 1855 to designs by the architect Charles Lanyon. A similar range of buildings was provided on the east side of the tracks in the 1880s.

The shared train and bus station building has a distinctive rotunda with a high arched entrance, by GM Design Associates.

A short distance from the station is a bascule bridge over the River Bann accommodating the railway over the river navigation.

Service

On Saturdays, the service remains hourly, with no peak time services.

On Sundays, trains alternate between Derry-Londonderry, Portrush and Great Victoria Street, offering an hourly service from Coleraine to Belfast 14 trains to and from Portrush but 8 of them trains start/terminating here and six trains to and from Londonderry.

References

Railway stations in County Londonderry
Coleraine
Railway stations opened in 1855
Railway stations served by NI Railways
Grade B1 listed buildings
Rail junctions in Northern Ireland
1855 establishments in Ireland
Railway stations in Northern Ireland opened in the 19th century